The Westerner is an American Western series that aired on NBC from September 30 to December 30, 1960. Created and produced by Sam Peckinpah, who also wrote and directed some episodes, the series was a Four Star Television production.  The Westerner stars Brian Keith as amiable, unexceptional cowhand/drifter Dave Blassingame, and features John Dehner as rakish Burgundy Smith, who appeared in three episodes.

Overview
Dave Blassingame is a cowboy and drifter who is handy with a gun and his fists, travelling through an often lawless country trying to get enough money together to buy his own ranch.

His dog Brown is played by Spike, trained by Frank Weatherwax and best known for playing the title role in Old Yeller.  Brown figures prominently in a number of episodes, appears in all of them, and always appears following Blassingame during the end credits.

Cast

Main
 Brian Keith as Dave Blassingame
 Spike as Brown
 Hank Gobble as Digger
 Jimmy Lee Cook as Band Member
 Michael T. Mikler as Band Member
 Marie Selland as Addie McKeen
 John Dehner as Burgundy Smith

Guest stars
Guest stars included Malcolm Atterbury, Ben Cooper, Katy Jurado, and John M. Pickard, Sam Jaffe, and one episode (the first, "Jeff") memorably featured Warren Oates as a drunk quietly passing out at a table. Other guest stars, like Ms. Jurado, would later go on to appear in some of Peckinpah's feature films. These included John Anderson (Ride the High Country), R. G. Armstrong (Pat Garrett and Billy the Kid), Dub Taylor (The Wild Bunch, The Getaway), and Mary Murphy (Junior Bonner).

Episodes

Production

Music 
The musical score was largely the work of Four Star's Herschel Burke Gilbert.

Release

Broadcast
The pilot for The Westerner appeared on CBS's Dick Powell's Zane Grey Theatre.

Syndication as The Westerners
For rerun syndication it was grouped with three other short-lived Western series from the same company, Black Saddle starring Peter Breck, Johnny Ringo starring Don Durant, and Law of the Plainsman starring Michael Ansara, under the umbrella title The Westerners, bracketed with hosting sequences featuring Keenan Wynn.

Home media
A two-DVD set of the complete series including the pilot episode was released by Shout! Factory in February 2017.

Reception
The critically acclaimed series ran for 13 episodes, but it was cancelled because of low ratings (due to being placed in the same time slot as The Flintstones and Route 66).

Spin-offs and remakes

The Losers (1963)
An attempt to update and revive the hardbitten series aired as a January 1963 episode of The Dick Powell Theater, "The Losers", directed by Peckinpah and featuring Lee Marvin as Dave Blassingame and Keenan Wynn as Burgundy Smith, but set in the modern West. Rosemary Clooney portrayed the leading lady.

Will Penny (1968)
One of the episodes of The Westerner, "Line Camp" guest-starring Robert Culp, was the basis for the 1968 film Will Penny starring Charlton Heston. Slim Pickens plays essentially the same role, as a feisty derby-wearing cook, in both the television episode and the movie.

The Gambler Returns (1991)
Brian Keith briefly played the same character again in 1991's The Gambler Returns: The Luck of the Draw, which featured a number of 1950s and 1960s television Western series leads reprising their roles in quick cameo appearances (Gene Barry as Bat Masterson, Hugh O'Brian as Wyatt Earp, Jack Kelly as Bart Maverick, Clint Walker as Cheyenne Bodie, David Carradine as Kung Fu'''s Caine, Chuck Connors as The Rifleman'', and so on).

References

External links

NBC original programming
1960s Western (genre) television series
Television series by Four Star Television
Television series by 20th Century Fox Television
1960 American television series debuts
1960 American television series endings
Black-and-white American television shows
English-language television shows